is a Japanese manga series written and illustrated by AidaIro. It has been serialized in Square Enix's magazine Monthly GFantasy since 2014. It has been collected in nineteen tankōbon volumes as of February 2023. The story follows Nene Yashiro, a first-year high school student fond of occult stories, ardently desires a boyfriend. For this, she tries to invoke Hanako-san from the toilet.

The manga is licensed in North America by Yen Press. An anime television series adaptation produced by Lerche aired from January to March 2020. A new anime project was announced, and was subsequently described as a "restart" of the series.

As of August 2022, Toilet-Bound Hanako-kun had over 8 million copies in circulation.

Plot
Kamome Academy is famous for its rumors regarding its Seven Wonders and supernatural occurrences. Nene Yashiro, a first-year high-school student who loves the occult and wishes for a boyfriend, summons the Seventh and most famous Wonder, "Hanako-san of the Toilet", the spirit of a girl who allegedly haunts the bathroom and can grant wishes for the right price. Upon summoning her, Nene discovers that "Hanako-san" is nothing like the rumors say; Hanako-san is a boy. With a turn of events, she is spiritually bound to Hanako and becomes his assistant, helping him destroy evil supernaturals and change rumors in order to maintain the balance between the spirit world and the human world. Along the way, Nene learns about her connection to the spirit world and the dark secrets regarding Hanako and his past.

Characters

Protagonists

 The most famous rumor in the school, Hanako-Kun is the Seventh Mystery of Kamome Academy Seven Mysteries. According to his rumor, Hanako can be summoned if one knocks on the third stall of the third floor of the girls' bathroom in the old school building; he is able to grant wishes to those who summon him in exchange for a suitable price. The strongest and the leader of the Seven Wonders, Hanako fights with a kitchen knife and his two haku-joudai, spirit orbs that assist him in monitoring others and summons to him a cloak that grants immunity to exorcism lightning. His duty is to monitor all of the supernaturals in the school and maintain the balance between humans and supernaturals. Something curious with him is thatHe has a melodious tone of voice when he speaks, giving the impression that he is always singing. 
Though childish and mischievous, Hanako puts up a front to mask his true emotions and is rather serious beneath the surface. He takes his duties seriously, having been promised by God that he would be absolved of his past sins if he fulfilled his duties. He is secretive about his past life. A second-year middle school student in 1969, he often came to school with bruises and cuts, having been repeatedly abused by someone he refused to reveal the identity of. He harbored a deep passion for astronomy and had dreams of becoming an astronaut and going to the moon. According to Tsuchigomori, the Fifth Wonder and his homeroom teacher at the time, Hanako was destined to become a science teacher, until his fate changed for unknown reasons. He killed his younger twin brother, Tsukasa Yugi, and died young. Hanako is the only known person to ever have altered his fate.
By inflicting himself with the Mermaid's Curse, he bound his and Yashiro's souls together. Although he calls her his assistant, deep down, since Hanako-kun met her, he considers her his friend and cares a lot about her. Even more so when he finds out that she only has one year left to live. He wants to give her a long future, he protects her fiercely even though on the surface he teases her and annoys her a lot, he often hugs her and doesn't care getting closer to her whenever he can, and he tends to flirt a lot but when Yashiro takes the first step he feels embarrassed.

Nene Yashiro is a first-year high school student at Kamome Academy. She summons Hanako and wishes for her crush, Teru Minamoto, to return her feelings. A turn of events occurs, and Yashiro swallows a mermaid's scale, inflicting her with the Mermaid's Curse and turning her into a fish. To grant her new wish of becoming human again, Hanako swallows a scale from the same mermaid to inflict himself with her curse and spread its effects, permitting Yashiro to remain a human child unless she is immersed in water. Having bound their souls together through the curse, he has Yashiro become his human assistant as payment. Yashiro works with Hanako to change and spread new rumors of supernaturals in the school to keep them under control. She is capable of destroying a School Wonder's yorishiro, their source of power; upon doing so, she falls asleep and views the memory associated with the yorishiro.
Yashiro wears two hair clips resembling magatama and a skull brooch on her school uniform. Yashiro is a very positive, sensitive, and caring girl. She is deeply insecure and genuinely fears that no one will ever love her back; after receiving the curse, she confesses to Hanako that she had realized what her true wish had been: she wanted someone, anyone, to return her feelings, not Teru specifically. Yashiro is insecure about her large ankles, often being compared to daikons as a running gag in the series. Her best friend is Aoi Akane, who loves to tell her new rumors.
Despite repeatedly claiming Hanako is not her type and Hanako's relentless teasing, she cares immensely for Hanako and after learning about his past, wants to be able to protect him. She is intuitive and sensitive to changes in his personality and is deeply affected whenever she learns new information about his past life.

Kou Minamoto is a third-year at Kamome Academy's middle school division and the second eldest son of the Minamoto Clan, a family of strong exorcists that believe all supernaturals are inherently evil. He uses a spear called the Raiteijou, a weapon passed down in the Minamoto family that transforms the wielder's spiritual power into lightning that exorcises supernaturals. Tasked by his older brother, Teru, to exorcise all Seven Wonders, Kou attempts to exorcise Hanako but does not possess enough spiritual power to do so. Not giving up, he tags Hanako and Yashiro around the school for a while and comes to the realization that Hanako did not seem to be an 'evil' supernatural. As a result, Kou vows to learn more about him and other supernaturals (like Mitsuba) before blindly exorcising them, much to the dissatisfaction of his brother.
When Kou finds Mitsuba haunting the lockers, he offers to spend the day with him in attempt to fulfill his final regrets so he can pass on peacefully. The two were in the same homeroom class in the first year and Kou feels guilty for not noticing him back then. After Tsukasa turns Mitsuba into a violent supernatural against his will, Kou watches Hanako destroy Mistuba and is devastated by the loss of his friend. Enraged and upset, he vows to get stronger to destroy evil supernaturals like Tsukasa.
Kou is a seeker of justice with a brave and kind personality, though he often finds himself in trouble due to his inexperience and low spiritual power. He is protective of Yashiro when he interprets Hanako as being mean or perverted. A running gag in the series is his earring on his right ear, an omamori that says '交通' (traffic).

 (Japanese); Kyle Igneczi (English) 
Mitsuba was Kou's middle school classmate in their first year who was killed in a car accident. He became a ghost and haunted the middle school lockers, calling out to students and hoping someone would remember him. Kou sees him after hearing about his rumor and though he doesn't recognise him from school, decides to help him fulfill whatever regret was keeping him at the school in order to help him pass on.
Mitsuba regrets having no friends while he was alive, and in his wish to Tsukasa, said he wanted everyone to recognise him. Because Tsukasa believed his initial wish was too vague, he decides that Mitsuba's real wish was that he wanted to stay with his friends forever. He grants him this wish instead and changes Mitsuba's rumor, turning him into a violent supernatural against his will. Tsukasa forces Mitsuba to kill Kou and fulfill his wish of being with his friend forever (through death), but Hanako arrives and destroys Mitsuba before he can do so. Tsukasa saves a part of his soul and recreates a new Mitsuba by attaching it to a body formed of low-level spirits he had killed. After killing No. 3, Tsukasa forces the new Mitsuba to eat No. 3's heart to become the new Third Mystery. Despite not being the original and having no memories, the new Mitsuba has the same personality and dreams of the old one, now wishing to become a real human.
Previously, Mitsuba didn't have friends because he was narcissistic and rude. Hoping to change in middle school, he repressed his personality, but then became bland and easily unnoticed. He was a talented and awarded photographer in the school's photography club. Mitsuba makes up insulting nicknames for people; he calls Kou 'stupid lame-ass traffic safety earring', Yashiro 'daikon-senpai', and Hanako 'crazy knife'. However, underneath his rudeness and narcissism, Mitsuba is desperate to be happy and becomes dejected when he thinks about his failures in his original life.

The Seven Wonders 
The Seven Wonders of Kamome Academy are the seven most famous supernatural rumors in the school, and their corresponding supernaturals serve to maintain the students' safety from murderous supernaturals. Leading them is Hanako, who is the Seventh and most famous school Wonder. Each one has their own Boundary, a  divine yorishiro, and an aspect of the school that they control. Their Boundary is a section of the school where their power is the strongest. Boundaries are the 'sea' between the Near Shore, where the living reside, and the Far Shore, where other apparitions exist and thus contain a small amount of water on the ground. A divine yorishiro is an item they cherish that acts as the source of their power. When a yorishiro is destroyed (by removing its seal), the Wonder's designated seat as a School Wonder and their power is removed. Thus, they are usually kept in the deepest region of the Boundary or safeguarded by the wonder themselves.

Representatives: Kako, Akane Aoi, and Mirai
Aspect: Time
 The Three Clock Keepers guard the clock tower of Kamome Academy and control time. Kako controls the past and can rewind time. One of Yashiro's classmates, is a human who is secretly a Clock Keeper; he controls the present and can stop time for five minutes each day. Mirai controls the future and can fast-forward time for someone by touching them.

Representative: 
Aspect: Space
 The Misaki Stairs is a staircase in front of the art room. Anyone who steps on the fourth step is rumored to be transported to the spirit world, shredded to death by "Misaki", and have their blood splattered on the staircase the following day. Yako, the kitsune spirit of a school inari statue, is the current No. 2. She fell in love with Misaki, a Kamome Academy school teacher who could see her, taught her how to read and write, and included her in his class photo. She never saw him again after he was rumored to have died in an accident on the school stairs. As her rumors changed, Yako was forced to shred those who entered her boundary and use their limbs to recreate Misaki. Her yorishiro is a pair of cutting shears, a gift from Misaki.

Representative: Mitsuba (ミツバ) 
 The Hell of Mirrors is a boundary once controlled by a bird-like supernatural. The Mirrors reveal one's deepest fears and insecurities, gaining power based on how much fear the person has. Tsukasa killed the previous representative, and his heart is ingested by Mitsuba, who became the new No. 3.

Representative: Shijima Mei (シジマメイ)
 Shijima Mei was a third-year art student rumored to have committed suicide because her parents didn't approve of her choice to pursue art professionally; in reality, Mei had been gravely ill and died before she could graduate. While working on an art assignment in the hospital, Mei imagined a fictional world where her alternate, healthy self could draw happily in a tower, wishing for her alternate to draw in her place after she dies. Unknowingly, Mei creates the supernatural Shijima, her alternate, ideal self, who watched over her for the remainder of her life and vowed to protect her. After the human Mei dies, her art is showcased in the art room and sparks the false rumors, which deeply angers Shijima because they tarnish Mei's reputation. Her Boundary is the tower within Mei's painting. She has the power to paint and create fictional worlds where people can live based on their deepest wishes. Her yorishiro is her sketchbook.
 

Representative: 
Aspect: Records
 The 4 pm Bookstacks is a mysterious room filled with books about every student's past, present and future, whose door is only accessible at 4 pm. The books come in three colors; white books record the living, black books record the dead, and red books contain the future and are forbidden to read. The curator of the Bookstacks is Tsuchigomori, a spider-like supernatural who lives as a human teacher at Kamome Academy. He is currently Kou's homeroom teacher and was previously Hanako's homeroom teacher before he died. As his teacher, he cared for Hanako and was deeply affected when he died. Before his death, Hanako asked Tsuchigomori to keep his most cherished possession, a rock he believed to have fell from the moon. The rock becomes Tsuchigomori's yorishiro after Yugi Amane dies.
No. 6 – The Reaper
Representative: Hakubo
 On the night of tsukimi, the Reaper is rumored to steal the lives of those who fall asleep while waiting to view the moon and can be heard playing a melody on the flute by individuals who will die soon. As a result, people weave baskets all night to stay awake and protect those who can hear the melody. The current No. 6 is Shinigami-sama, the God of Death. His Boundary, which lies below the school, is the closest one to the Far Shore. His yorishiro is a girl named Sumire, an ancestor of Aoi who he guarded until she was sacrificed.

Representative: Hanako-Kun 
 The most famous School Mystery. Hanako is referred to as a female, but Hanako is actually a male. He has the power to grant wishes to the living but as compensation, he must take something dear to them in return.

Kamome Academy Supernaturals
Apart from the Seven Mysteries, there are other, less powerful supernaturals that roam the school. They rely on student rumors to gain power, unlike the Mysteries who already have theirs so popular and widespread among the student body. 

Known as "Yousei-San", the Mokke are in fact, sweets-loving rabbit-like supernaturals. They have a slight case of kleptomania, enjoy committing small, random acts of theft. Due to their timidness and weak appearance, the Mokke tend to merge together to create large, horrifying creatures to fight off enemies, which scares the student population.
 

Known as "". It was known to be planted by 'The God of Love'. Kodama is actually a spirit in the form of a tree determined to spread love among the students but can be too meddlesome and forceful with its methods. After it is defeated by Hanako, it turns to the size of a broccoli, having been greatly weakened.

Antagonists

Hanako's younger identical twin brother. When they were still alive, the twins were supposedly very close until he was killed by Hanako. He is cheerful and overwhelmingly childish, but his personality switches quickly to show a disturbing and deranged side. He does not think about actions and acts on whims, deciding to kill things merely because he feels it is fun. The twins have opposing beliefs; while Hanako stresses the importance of maintaining a peaceful balance between humans and supernaturals, Tsukasa believes that the two should behave how they desire, even if it means wreaking tremendous havoc. While Hanako grants wishes to the living, Tsukasa grants wishes to the dead. He wears a black short-sleeved kimono with a grey hakama and a white button-up underneath. Opposite of Hanako, he has a black yorishiro seal on his right cheek and uses black koku-joudai willow wisps. Tsukasa works with his assistant, Sakura, to change the rumors of supernaturals in the school for his own purposes.

A beautiful third-year high school student at Kamome Academy. Similar to Yashiro, she became Tsukasa's assistant after he granted her a wish. She is the president of the Broadcasting Club and helps him broadcast altered rumors of supernaturals. Sakura is usually stoic and gets annoyed with both Natsuhiko and Tsukasa, resorting to imagining Tsukasa as a cat rather than a boy, making his actions more palatable.

 
A second-year student at Kamome Academy and a member of the Broadcasting Club. He is often seen trying to win Sakura's affection but to no avail. Though not bound to Tsukasa, Natsuhiko helps in Tsukasa's schemes. His flippant personality tends to lead him into trouble all on its own.

Others

A second-year high school student, the student body president, and the most popular male student in the school. He is Kou's older brother and the eldest son of the Minamoto Clan. A prodigious exorcist, he was trained by his family elders since he was young to exorcise supernaturals and instilled with the family sentiment that all supernaturals are inherently evil. Despite his calm and gentle appearance, he is ruthless and frighteningly perceptive. He harbors a slightly sadistic streak, frequently terrorizing the Mokke to work as his servants. He dotes on his younger siblings and wants Kou to exorcise the Seven Mysteries so he can get stronger. Teru often spends his nights exorcising supernaturals, forcing him to only sleep after school.

A first-year high school student and Yashiro's best friend. The school's prettiest and most popular girl. She enjoys rumors about the Seven Mysteries and recounting their stories to Yashiro. Yashiro notes that suspiciously, all the rumors Aoi tells her about come true. This is hinted to be related to her origins as someone who possesses the blood of Kannagi. Aoi and Yashiro are both in the Gardening Club. Akane Aoi is her neighbor and childhood friend.

A first-year student at Kamome Academy and Akane's best friend. He acts nonchalant and is often seen on his phone.

Two third-year middle school students at Kamome Academy and Kou's best friends. Yokoo enjoys sports is usually relaxed and cheerful. Satou enjoys baking and sweets, he usually has a stern and serious personality.

Media

Manga
Toilet-Bound Hanako-kun is written and illustrated by AidaIro. The series started in the July 2014 issue of Square Enix's Monthly GFantasy, published on June 18, 2014. Square Enix has compiled its chapters into individual tankōbon volumes. The first volume was published on May 22, 2015. A volume 0 was released on December 27, 2019. As of February 27, 2023, nineteen volumes have been published.

In North America, Yen Press announced in July 2017 that they would publish the manga digitally. In July 2019, Yen Press announced the print release of the series.

An spin-off titled Hōkago Shōnen Hanako-kun launched on August 27th 2019. It was licensed by Yen Press under the title After-School Hanako-kun; and released in April 2021.

Volume list

Anime

An anime television series adaptation was announced in the April issue of Monthly GFantasy magazine on March 18, 2019. The series is animated by Lerche and directed by Masaomi Andō, with Yasuhiro Nakanishi handling series composition, and Mayuka Itou designing the characters. Hiroshi Takaki composed the music. It premiered from January 9, 2020, to March 26, 2020, on TBS, SUN, CBC, and BS-TBS. Jibaku Shōnen Band performed the series' opening theme song "No.7", while Akari Kitō performed the series' ending theme song "Tiny Light." The series has run for 12 episodes. Funimation had licensed the series for a simuldub. Following Sony's acquisition of Crunchyroll, the series was moved to Crunchyroll.

In December 2022, a new anime project was announced, and was subsequently described as a "restart" of the series.

Reception
By August 2022, Toilet-Bound Hanako-kun had over 8 million copies in circulation.

In a review of the anime series for NEO, Alex Jones praised the series and characters for being engaging, as well as the unique visuals, comparing Hanako-kun to a comic book brought to life, utilizing thick outlines, vibrant colors and distinct character proportions.

References

External links
 Toilet-Bound Hanako-kun at Monthly GFantasy 
  
 

2020 anime television series debuts
Anime series based on manga
Comedy anime and manga
Crunchyroll anime
Gangan Comics manga
Lerche (studio)
Shōnen manga
Square Enix franchises
Supernatural anime and manga
TBS Television (Japan) original programming
Yen Press titles